Lil and Put (Lil i Put) is a ongoing comedy-fantasy Polish comic book series for children created by Maciej Kur (script) and Piotr Bednarczyk (art).

The series centres on adventures of two "Małoludy" ("Not-much-people", a Hobbit-like race) named Lil and Put (obvious pun on Liliputs from the novel Gulliver's Travels). The duo are vagabonds travelling the land looking for easy meals and money, usually getting into trouble. The stories are currently publish in Nowa Fantastyka magazine.

The series is set in a fantasy pastiche land, full of mythological creatures from well known centaurs, fairies, trolls dragons and dwarfs to obscure Slavic mythology utopiec or Leszy as well races created by Kur and Bednarczyk. A notable character is a female elf sorceress named Miksja Iskier who is a college student at travelling wizard school. The humor is similar to Asterix series combining gags for younger and older audience mixing slapstick, puns and zany scenarios with references (both pop-cultural and literary), satirical elements and dark humor targeted at adult readers.

History
The initial story won award for comic series for children in the spirit of Janusz Christa (author of the legendary Polish comic strip series Kajko i Kokosz) in March 2014 and meet with positive reception The first book version, Jak przelać kota do kieliszka? (How do you pour a cat into a drinking glass?) premiered the same year at International Festival of Comics and Games at Łódź. The series is published by Egmont Poland, the largest Polish comic book publishing company. In 2017 one of the stories became part of Polish textbook for 7'th grade children. Since the same year the stories became a regular part of the popular Nowa Fantastyka magazine (known for being the debut place of The Witcher) A lot of stories from the magazine are yet to appear in the book form.

List of titles
 Lil i Put 01 – Jak przelać kota do kieliszka? (2014) ["How to pour a cat into the drinkig glass?]
 Lil i Put 02 – CHODU!!! (2015)  ["RUN!!!]
 Lil i Put 03 – Czarująca Panna Młoda (2017) ["The enchanting bride"] 
 Lil i Put 04 - Zawodowi Bumelanci (2019) ["Professional shirkers"] 
 Lil i Put 05 -  Parada Przypałów (2020) ["The Blunder parade"]

Characters
 Lil - Red hair "małolud". With Put he they are both jobless a drifter who only want to live to have fun, however he is much more aggressive and impetuous in nature. He and Put live in a village "Miniatury Wielkie" (Minatures the Great) but tends to travel a lot to look for easy money and cheap food, usually geting into crazy adventures. On occasion he is shown to be very cheap and going out of his way not to do any unnecessary spending. 
 Put - Lil's friend and long-distance cousin. He is much more calm, friendly, imaginative and carless then Lil, but nevertheless he is devoted friend to him. On occasion he is shown to play the guitar, where his talent is enjoyed by other Małoludy, but not by other species who find it dreadful.  
 Miksja Iskier - a female elf, good friend of Lil & Put. A student of magic, who is already very powerful. She is a mix of rational and eccentric and can be impulsive once she looses her patience. She is a satire on Polish students, particularly in stories that center around her school life.
 Kirki - An Goblin, and Miksja's pet. He acts like a dog and is very devoted to Miksja.
 Ivan Siwy - ("Siwy" can be translated as "The gray" or "The wite" referring to his beard color) A dwarf and leader of a group of Troll hunters. He is ruthless pettifogger who kills anything he doesn't like, but tends to justify his actions with nonsensical rationality, making him look insane. He hates elves the most and is in odds with Miksja, who he constantly tries to slain with poor effect. He jumps between a villain and being helpful to Lil and Put (the later usually when Miksja isn't around). The other members of his team are dwarfs named Borys, Bupert and Marcel.
 Świętopełk - a "dodo bird shepherd". A lazy friend of Lil and Put from their home village, who talks in nonsensical jargon, that is parody of many Polish dialects. Some times things he says prove to be true or brilliant, while other times it's just backwards logic. He is parody of Polish rednecks.
 Kieszonka (Pocket) - Lil's sister, who is a professional thief and a burglar which in "Lil and Put" world seem to treated like any other profession. She is cynical, manipulative and tend to do sarcastic remarks toward her brother. 
 Nicola Flamel - a female alchemist, a friend of Miksja who runs an alchemy shop. Lil and Put often go to her to buy helpful potions and artifacts (as well Miksja who has little talent in potion making). She is shown to be brilliant scientist but clueless in anything outside of her craft. Her name is homage to actual alchemist Nicolas Flamel.

References

External links 
  
 Publishers page
 Article about the series in Silesian

Fantasy comics
Humor comics
Polish comics titles
Comic strip duos
Male characters in comics